Flaka e Janarit ("January Flame") is a cultural festival, multidimensional cultural event that starts on 11 January in Gjilan, Kosovo with symbolic opening of the flame, to keep up with various cultural activities to 31 January of each year.

In this city, it gathers thousands of artists and art lovers from all the Albanian territories, who for three consecutive weeks transform the city into a culture metropolis. The nation's martyrs are honored through values of art by this event, which began before the 10th anniversary of the assassination of the writer, the activist and the patriot Jusuf Gërvalla, along with Kadri Zeka and Bardhosh Gërvalla.

It was exactly the tenth anniversary without these three martyrs of freedom and from coincidence of these murders in a same date on 11 January, this event got this name Flaka e Janarit. Moreover, this month has "devoured" many devout patriots.

History
This event started in 1991. For years it is being developed in these places, Bresalca–Përlepnica–Gjilan. "Flaka e Janarit" did not only serve as a highly qualitative cultural event to remember martyrs, it also reflected the situation in Kosovo. Founder of Manifestation were Independent Cultural Association (which operated from 1991 to 1999) and the Youth Forum of LDK, in Gjilan. Also the one who contributed a lot, the one of the biggest supporters until his death, was known as Albanian writer, Beqir Musliu.

It was named as "Flaka e Janarit", because in this month heroically had fallen martyrs, as Skanderbeg, Jusuf Gërvalla, Isa Boletini, Kadri Zeka, Bardhosh Gërvalla, Rexhep Mala, Nuhi Berisha and other Albanians who gave their life for freedom and national unity.

Until 1999, this event was held in circumstances of occupation by Serbian militants. For this reason it was considered an illegal organization for eight consecutive years.

In 1999 when the massacre of Reçak happened, shocked the democratic world, and as a sign of mourning and honor to the massacred martyrs, organizers removed over half of the program. This let us understand that, even after many hard circumstances of Kosova from invaders, "Flaka e Janarit" did not stop its journey.

There were four pillars, derived from writing of Jusuf Gërvalla:
 Literary,
 Performing,
 Music, and
 Visual Arts

Personalities that "Flaka e Janarit" is dedicated to

Rexhep Malaj
He was among the greats patriots in Kosovo. Was born on March 29, 1951 in Hogosht-Kamenice. After he finished eighth grade in elementary school, on May 20.1965, his family moved in Gjilan. He went to the "Zejnel Hajdini" high school in Gjilan in 1966/67. Was different from the others because he had skills for sports. Was suspended from high school because he organized few demonstrations. After this, in 1969, he continued studying in "Skanderbeg" high school. In academic year of 1969/70, after he ended the second academic year in Preshevë, he re-continued the third year of middle school in "Zejnel Hajdini". During the last year of his studying, he was employed as a teacher in elementary school "Liria" in Marec village. With this accomplishment he reached his goal of being a teacher. One of the famous quotes is: "The days are passing like arrows, along with them and the life, on despite this memory remains never digested". Today for his patriotic actions talk many his friends who fought together to protect homeland, and we see his name in any flag of Albania.

Nuhi Berisha
Nuhi Berisha was born on October 3, 1961 in Svirca of Kamenica. Grew up and was educated in a patriotic and revolucionar family. After he finished primary school, he enrolled in "Zejnel Hajdini" high school, in Gjilan, Kosovo. In high school he became friend with Rexhep Mala, with whom he fought for Kosovo's freedom and unity. After Nuhi Berisha finished high school, he went in the Law Faculty of University of Pristina, and later also in the Faculty of Sports.

Kadri Zeka
He was born on April 25, 1953 in the village Poliçkë-Hogosht. Studied in Prishtina. He was a journalist and a lawyer. After some years he went in Switzerland, where was active in many Albanian organizations in exile, and maintained.

Jusuf and Bardhosh Gërvalla
Patriotic brothers. Jusuf was born on October 1, 1945 in Dubovik, in an Intellectual family. He was very smart, and had all quality and dimensions that make an outstanding personality. Unfortunately his possibilities remain completely unspoken. Soon after the night of 17 January 1982 he and his brother were killed in Untergruppenbach near bulletproof Stuttgart from Albanians nation adversaries. The murder of Jusuf Gërvalla terminated the original creations of Albanian creations. The novel " Rrotull " is the first effort of Jusuf Gërvalla on writing a long prose but this novel is unfinished because of his death. Jusuf Gërvalla's literary creativity, his poetry and journalism had an important impact in the development of the art and of the Albanian opinions.

A famous quote of Jusuf Gërvalla is:"At the forefront of this nation and to its feet, sacrifice and death for realizing its aspirations, will come to us with glory through life.

Activities dedicated to Flaka e Janarit

Concert of classical music.
Brush of flame- few awards are given in visual arts, then opens the exhibition of Albanian artists. Also the award "Shopper gallery" is given there.
Flame's talia- The Festival of Albanian Drama.
Flame's pens - Literary competition.
Folk flame - selected songs, dances and games from the Albanian tradition. 
Xixëllonjat e flakes - Music concert for children, presenting smaller soloists. 
Flame's pentagram - the part of the musical event. 
Competition of enigmatic - contestants are evaluated for accuracy and speed in solving crossword.
Flame's fest - the festival of folk songs.

Concert of classical music
This concert is started by ballet. Albanian soloists perform different songs before public. Also there are presented different songs with instruments by them.

Brush of flame
Is one of the most important pillars of this multicultural event, in the framework of which are allocated three awards of visual arts, and it is given the award "Buyer Gallery" by the professional jury. For visual arts are given these awards:
Award for the best picture,
Award for the best sculpture,
Award for the best graphics.

In this activity, are opened the exhibition in all branches of art, as in the picture, graphic sculpture, artistic photo or conceptual art, where participate creative artists by various Albanian regions.

Flame's talia
The Festival of Albanian Drama that has a competitive nature. During this festival are a few performances from Albanian from different regions. After each performance there is a debate where various reviews are provided by appropriate professionals. After all the performances, in this competitive festival are given these awards:

Award for the best show of the festival,
Award for the most original text – drama,
Award for the best director of the festival,
Award for the best actor(male)in the festival,
Award for the best actor(female)in the festival,
Special award for achievement in life,
Award for the exceptional actor,
Award for the best secondary role,
Award for theatrical realities .

Flame's pens
In the framework of this activity is given the award for " The best poetry ", which is read in the city literary hour. Here are three awards for poetry and short story competition, where the authors do not dare to indicate their identity and if they do not fulfill these criteria, their creations are removed from the competition.

Folk flame
It is an activity casting Albanian ensembles that interpret dances, games and songs from the Albanian traditions. Also soloists interpret different songs.

Xixëllonjat e flakes
Is a festival where small soloists interpret. Also groups of dancers interpret different choreography. Part of this activity is and choir of children that are accompanied by younger soloists.

Flame's pentagram
It is a music part where songs are presented by different singers and groups. This has character in the genre of popular music, folk and modern music. This activity has its agement which is interpreted by singers from Gjilan . At the end of this activity are rewarded the best.

Competition of enigmatic

It has competitive character, where will be given three awards for three contestants who evaluated for accuracy and speed in solving various crosswords.

Fest flame
Here are presented singers, dancers, and artists from all Albanian regions, who present Albanian folk. Singers interpret on stage accompanied by the Artistic Musicians Group''.  Fest Flame also has a competitive nature, where in the end, professional jury selects the best songs of the year, where are given three main awards.

Flaka e Janarit today
Year by year this cultural event is estimating and improving more. This manifestation is paid from Municipality of Gjilan, and a symbolic assistance from the Ministry of Culture. As usual today and onwards, on January 11, the flame of the " Flaka e Janarit " is fired, a cultural event which respect not only the municipality, but all Kosovo's cities. So this is one of the reason why it's called a national cultural event. Flaka e Janarit is being improved in all aspects, where for substantive issue work cultural responsible.

References

External links
http://kk.rks-gov.net/gjilan/News/Bordi-i--Flakes-se-Janarit-2014%E2%80%9D-percakton-kalenda.aspx
http://kk.rks-gov.net/gjilan/News/Ndizet-flakadani-i--Flakes-se-Janarit-2014%E2%80%9D-%281%29.aspx
http://kk.rks-gov.net/gjilan/News/Programi-i-manifestimit-kulturor--Flaka-e-Janarit-.aspx
http://kk.rks-gov.net/gjilan/News/Advertisement/Vleresimi-jurise-profesionale-te-konkursit-letrar-.aspx
http://www.botasot.info/kultura/266013/shpallen-fituesit-e-ekspozites-kolektive-flaka-e-janarit-2014/

Winter events in Kosovo
Festivals in Kosovo
Gjilan